The 1963 Marj earthquake occurred on February 21 in northern Libya. Financial losses totaled $5 million USD, with 290–375 deaths, 375–500 injuries, and 12,000 homeless.

Tectonic setting 
The northern part of Cyrenaica lies close to the northern edge of the African Plate. Offshore lies the Mediterranean Ridge, an accretionary wedge, developed above the destructive plate boundary where the African Plate is being subducted beneath the Aegean Sea Plate along the Hellenic subduction zone. The Cyrenaica promontory is thought to be undergoing incipient collision as the continental margin enters the subduction zone. The Cyrenaica region is characterised by relatively low magnitude earthquakes with thrust fault focal mechanisms, developed in a area of NE–SW directed maximum horizontal stress.

Earthquake
The earthquake's epicenter is located about 13 km to the north-northeast of the city of Marj in the Marj District of Cyrenaica. It was felt as far away as Benghazi, about 100 km from the epicenter.   The magnitude has been calculated as 5.6 by the ISC. It was followed later that day by two aftershocks of over 4.0.

Damage
The main area of damage was restricted to a 20 km long section of the alluvial plain around Marj, which is located between two escarpments, possibly fault-related. The maximum damage was observed at Maddalena, a village about 12 km from Marj and close to the epicenter, in which all the farmhouses collapsed. The effects of the shaking depended on the construction type of the buildings. Those built of rubble masonry were most affected, with many collapsing and causing most of the casualties. Buildings constructed from hollow concrete blocks were only moderately affected and those built with reinforced concrete were almost completely unaffected.

Aftermath
The Libyan authorities followed the recommendations of the UNESCO report and rebuilt Marj on firmer ground about 4 km away from its original location.

See also 
 List of earthquakes in 1963

References

External links
M 5.6 - near the coast of Libya – United States Geological Survey

Earthquakes in Libya
1963 earthquakes
1963 in Libya